The Christian Party, which includes the Scottish Christian Party and the Welsh Christian Party, is a minor political party in Great Britain.

United Kingdom Parliament

House of Commons

By-elections, 2005–10

2010 general election
The party fielded 71 candidates who polled 18,622 votes. In the seats it contested, the party received an average of 0.60% of the votes, losing all deposits at a cost of £35,500.

Source:

By-elections, 2010–15

2015 general election
The party fielded 9 candidates who between them polled 3,205 votes, losing eight deposits at a cost of £4,000.

Source:

* Williams has also contested Erith and Thamesmead for the English Democrats in the 2010 general election, the London region for the Christian Peoples Alliance in the 2014 European elections, in Sidcup for the Liberal Party in the 2018 local election and Vale of Glamorgan for Gwlad Gwlad in the 2019 general election.

2017 general election

2019 general election

Scottish Parliament

2007 Scottish Parliament election 
The election was on 3 May 2007. 
Constituencies
The party received 4,616 across the 7 constituencies it contested.

Source:

Additional Member System – Regional

2011 Scottish Parliament election
The election was on 5 May 2011.
Additional Member System – Regional

National Assembly for Wales

2007 National Assembly for Wales election
The election was held on 3 May 2007. The party received 8,693 votes (0.9%) in the regional additional member polls, but did not contest individual constituencies.

Source:

2011 National Assembly for Wales election
The election was held on 5 May 2011. The party received  votes (%) in the regional additional member polls, but did not contest individual constituencies.

European Parliament elections

2009 European Parliament election in the United Kingdom
The European Parliament election was held in the UK on 4 June 2009.

References

Election results by party in the United Kingdom
Christian political parties in the United Kingdom